Boleros is an album by pianist Tete Montoliu recorded in 1977 and originally released on the Spanish label, Ensayo.

Reception

Ken Dryden of AllMusic said "Tete Montoliu, a native of the Catalonian region of Spain, was best-known for his interpretations of standards from the Great American Songbook; he was equally familiar with popular works by jazz greats. This release has a different focus, emphasizing the works of Spanish composers. ... Recommended".

Track listing
 "Somos" (Mario Clavel) – 4:22
 "Adoro" (Armando Manzanero) – 5:19
 "Miénteme" (Alberto Domínguez) – 5:13
 "Sabrá Dios" (Álvaro Carrillo) – 4:12
 "Siboney" (Ernesto Lecuona) – 3:45
 "Somos Novios" (Armando Manzanero) – 5:12
 "Por Elamor de Una Mujer" (Sonny Marti, Danny Daniel) – 4:50
 "Piel Canela" (Bobby Capó) – 3:11
 "Sabor a M" (Carrillo) – 4:56
 "Poinciana" (Nat Simon, Buddy Bernier) – 4:32

Personnel
Tete Montoliu – piano
Manuel Elias – bass 
Peer Wyboris – drums 
Rogelio Juárez – percussion

References

Tete Montoliu live albums
1977 live albums